Delmira Agustini (October 24, 1886 – July 6, 1914) was an Uruguayan poet of the early 20th century.

Biography
Born in Montevideo, Uruguay, she began writing when she was ten and had her first book of poems published when she was still a teenager.

She wrote for the magazine La Alborada (The Dawn). She formed part of the Generation of 1900, along with Julio Herrera y Reissig, Leopoldo Lugones and Horacio Quiroga.

Rubén Darío, a Nicaraguan poet, was an important influence for her. She looked up to him as a teacher. Darío compared Agustini to Teresa of Ávila, stating that Agustini was the only woman writer since the saint to express herself as a woman.

She specialized in the topic of female sexuality during a time when the literary world was dominated by men. Agustini's writing style is best classified in the first phase of modernism, with themes based on fantasy and exotic subjects.

Eros, god of love, symbolizes eroticism and is the inspiration to Agustini's poems about carnal pleasures. Eros is the protagonist in many of Agustini's literary works. She even dedicated her third book to him titled Los Cálices Vacíos (Empty Chalices) in 1913, which was acclaimed as her entrance into a new literary movement, "La Vanguardia" (The Vanguard).

Personal life and death
She married Enrique Job Reyes on August 14, 1913. Their divorce was finalized on June 5, 1914. A month after that, Reyes fatally shot Agustini twice in the head and afterwards committed suicide. She died in her house in Montevideo, Uruguay. She is buried in the Central Cemetery of Montevideo.

Bibliography
 1907: El libro blanco
 1910: Cantos de la mañana
 1913: Los cálices vacíos, pórtico de Rubén Darío
 1924: Obras completas ("Complete Works"): Volume 1, El rosario de Eros; Volume 2: Los astros del abismo, posthumously published (died 1914), Montevideo, Uruguay: Máximo García
 1944: Poesías, prologue by Luisa Luisi (Montevideo, Claudio García & Co.)
 1971: Poesías completas, prólogue and notes by Manuel Alvar, Barcelona: Editorial Labor

Works translated into other languages
Valerie Martínez has translated many of Agustini's poems into English. Some of Agustini's poems are translated into Nepali by Suman Pokhrel, and collected in an anthology titled Manpareka Kehi Kavita.

References

External links

Cathy L. Jrade,"Modernization, Feminism, and Delmira Agustini". Vanderbilt University
Judy Veramendi, The Empty Chalices, a novel and play based on the life and writings of Delmira Agustini.
 

19th-century Uruguayan poets
Uruguayan people of Italian descent
1886 births
1914 deaths
Uruguayan murder victims
Deaths by firearm in Uruguay
People murdered in Uruguay
Burials at the Central Cemetery of Montevideo
Uruguayan women poets
20th-century Uruguayan poets
20th-century Uruguayan women writers
19th-century Uruguayan women writers
19th-century Uruguayan writers
Murder–suicides in South America
1914 murders in Uruguay
1+1 (TV channel) people